Pisari is a small settlement in the City Municipality of Koper in the Littoral region of Slovenia close to the border with Croatia.

References

External links
Pisari on Geopedia

Populated places in the City Municipality of Koper